Olios is the largest genus of huntsman spiders, containing 166 species. They are found throughout the world, with most species occurring in hot countries. The genus was first described by Charles Athanase Walckenaer in 1837.

Description 
They are small to large Sparassidae, that have eight eyes in two partially straight rows. For the smaller species of this genus, they are usually light brown to brown with darker areas. Most larger species are darker, and some members of this genus may also be green. They are nocturnal hunters.

Habitat 
As this genus is widespread, they are found in a large variety of habitats, from savannahs to rainforest. They are mainly found in vegetation, and rarely houses. They are sometimes shipped alongside fruit, but this is not a common occurrence.

Species
 it contains 166 species, according to the World Spider Catalogue:

 Olios acolastus Thorell, 1890 — Sumatra
 Olios acostae Schenkel, 1953 — Venezuela
 Olios actaeon Pocock, 1899 — New Britain
 Olios admiratus Pocock, 1901 — India
 Olios alluaudi Simon, 1887 — Ivory Coast
 Olios angolensis Jäger, 2020 — Angola
 Olios argelasius Walckenaer, 1805 — Mediterranean
 Olios artemis Hogg, 1916 — New Guinea
 Olios atomarius Simon, 1880 — Peru
 Olios attractus Petrunkevitch, 1911 — Brazil
 Olios aurantiacus Mello-Leitão, 1918 — Brazil
 Olios auricomis Simon, 1880 — Zanzibar
 Olios batesi Pocock, 1899 — Cameroon
 Olios baulnyi Simon, 1874 — Morocco, Senegal, Sudan
 Olios benitensis Pocock, 1899 — Cameroon
 Olios berlandi Roewer, 1951 — New Caledonia
 Olios bhattacharjeei (Saha & Raychaudhuri, 2007) — India
 Olios bhavnagarensis Sethi & Tikader, 1988 — India
 Olios biarmatus Lessert, 1925 — South Africa
 Olios brachycephalus Lawrence, 1938 — South Africa
 Olios bungarensis Strand, 1913 — Sumatra
 Olios canalae Berland, 1924 — New Caledonia
 Olios canariensis Lucas, 1838 — Canary Islands
 Olios caprinus Mello-Leitão, 1918 — Brazil
 Olios chelifer Lawrence, 1937 — South Africa
 Olios chubbi Lessert, 1923 — South Africa
 Olios clarus Keyserling, 1880 — Mexico
 Olios claviger Pocock, 1901 — South Africa
 Olios coccineiventris Simon, 1880 — Moluccas, New Guinea
 Olios coenobitus Fage, 1926 — Madagascar
 Olios correvoni Lessert, 1921 — East Africa
 Olios correvoni choupangensis Lessert, 1936 — Mozambique
 Olios correvoni nigrifrons Lawrence, 1928 — Southern Africa
 Olios crassus Banks, 1909 — Costa Rica
 Olios croseiceps Pocock, 1898 — Malawi
 Olios darlingi Pocock, 1901 — South Africa
 Olios debalae (Biswas & Roy, 2005) - India
 Olios debilipes Mello-Leitão, 1945 — Argentina
 Olios denticulus Jäger, 2020 — Indonesia (Java)
 Olios diao Jäger, 2012 — Laos, Cambodia
 Olios digitatus Sun, Li & Zhang, 2011 — China
 Olios discolorichelis Caporiacco, 1947 — Guyana
 Olios durlaviae Biswas & Raychaudhuri, 2005 — Bangladesh
 Olios erraticus Fage, 1926 — Madagascar
 Olios erroneus O. P.-Cambridge, 1890 — Guatemala to Venezuela
 Olios extensus Berland, 1924 — New Caledonia
 Olios faesi Lessert, 1933 — Angola
 Olios fasciculatus Simon, 1880 — USA, Mexico
 Olios fasciiventris Simon, 1880 — Zanzibar
 Olios feldmanni Strand, 1915 — Cameroon
 Olios ferox Thorell, 1892 — Indonesia or Australia
 Olios fimbriatus Chrysanthus, 1965 — New Guinea
 Olios flavens Nicolet, 1849 — Chile
 Olios floweri Lessert, 1921 — Ethiopia, East Africa
 Olios fonticola Pocock, 1902 — South Africa
 Olios francoisi Simon, 1898 — Loyalty Islands
 Olios freyi Lessert, 1929 — Congo
 Olios fulvithorax Berland, 1924 — New Caledonia
 Olios galapagoensis Banks, 1902 — Galapagos Islands
 Olios gambiensis Jäger, 2020 — Gambia
 Olios gaujoni (Simon, 1897) - Ecuador
 Olios gentilis Karsch, 1879 — West Africa
 Olios giganteus Keyserling, 1884 — USA, Mexico
 Olios gravelyi Sethi & Tikader, 1988 — India
 Olios hampsoni Pocock, 1901 — India
 Olios hirtus Karsch, 1879 — Sri Lanka
 Olios hoplites Caporiacco, 1941 — Ethiopia
 Olios humboldtianus Berland, 1924 — New Caledonia
 Olios igraya (Barrion & Litsinger, 1995) -  Philippines (Luzon)
 Olios inaequipes Simon, 1890 — Sunda Islands
 Olios insignifer Chrysanthus, 1965 — New Guinea
 Olios insulanus Thorell, 1881 — Kei Islands
 Olios jaenicke Jäger, 2012 — Laos
 Olios jaldaparaensis Saha & Raychaudhuri, 2007 — India
 Olios japonicus Jäger & Ono, 2000 — Ryukyu Islands
 Olios kassenjicola Strand, 1916 — Central Africa
 Olios kolosvaryi (Caporiacco, 1947) - Ethiopia
 Olios kruegeri Simon, 1897 — South Africa
 Olios kunzi Jäger, 2020 — Namibia, South Africa
 Olios lacticolor Lawrence, 1952 — South Africa
 Olios lamarcki Latreille, 1806 — Madagascar to Sri Lanka, India
 Olios lepidus Vellard, 1924 — Brazil
 Olios longipedatus Roewer, 1951 — Brazil
 Olios longipes (Simon, 1884) — Sudan
 Olios lucieni Jäger, 2020 — Ethiopia, Kenya
 Olios lutescens Thorell, 1894 — Pakistan, Myanmar, Sumatra, Java
 Olios machadoi Lawrence, 1952 — South Africa
 Olios macroepigynus Soares, 1944 — Brazil
 Olios maculatus Blackwall, 1862 — Brazil, West Indies
 Olios mahabangkawitus Barrion & Litsinger, 1995 — Philippines
 Olios marshalli Pocock, 1898 — South Africa
 Olios menghaiensis Wang & Zhang, 1990 — China
 Olios milleti Pocock, 1901 — India, Sri Lanka
 Olios minensis Mello-Leitão, 1917 — Brazil
 Olios monticola Berland, 1924 — New Caledonia
 Olios mordax O. P.-Cambridge, 1899 — Madagascar
 Olios muang Jäger & Praxaysombath, 2009 — Laos
 Olios mutabilis Mello-Leitão, 1917 — Brazil
 Olios mygalinus Doleschall, 1857 — Moluccas, New Guinea
 Olios mygalinus cinctipes Merian, 1911 — Sulawesi
 Olios mygalinus nigripalpis Merian, 1911 — Sulawesi
 Olios nanningensis Hu & Ru, 1988 — China
 Olios nentwigi Jäger, 2020 — Indonesia (Krakatau Is.)
 Olios neocaledonicus Berland, 1924 — New Caledonia
 Olios nigrifrons Simon, 1897 — Java
 Olios nigriventris Taczanowski, 1872 — French Guiana
 Olios oberzelleri Kritscher, 1966 — New Caledonia
 Olios obesulus Pocock, 1901 — India
 Olios obscurus Keyserling, 1880 — Mexico, Costa Rica, Panama
 Olios obtusus F. O. P.-Cambridge, 1900 — Guatemala
 Olios oubatchensis Berland, 1924 — New Caledonia
 Olios paraensis Keyserling, 1880 — Brazil
 Olios pellucidus Keyserling, 1880 — Peru
 Olios perezi Barrion & Litsinger, 1995 — Philippines
 Olios peruvianus Roewer, 1951 — Peru
 Olios pictus (Simon, 1885) - Morocco, Algeria, Tunisia, Israel, Saudi Arabia
 Olios plumipes Mello-Leitão, 1937 — Brazil
 Olios princeps Hogg, 1914 — New Guinea
 Olios pulchripes Thorell, 1899 — Cameroon
 Olios punctipes Simon, 1884 — India to Sumatra
 Olios punctipes sordidatus Thorell, 1895 — Myanmar
 Olios punjabensis Dyal, 1935 — Pakistan
 Olios pusillus Simon, 1880 — Madagascar
 Olios pyrozonis Pocock, 1901 — India
 Olios quinquelineatus Taczanowski, 1872 — French Guiana
 Olios roeweri Caporiacco, 1955 — Guyana
 Olios rosettii Leardi, 1901 — India
 Olios rotundiceps Pocock, 1901 — India
 Olios rubripes Taczanowski, 1872 — French Guiana
 Olios rubriventris Thorell, 1881 — Moluccas, New Guinea
 Olios ruwenzoricus Strand, 1913 — Central Africa
 Olios scalptor Jäger & Ono, 2001 — Taiwan
 Olios senilis Simon, 1880 — India, Sri Lanka
 Olios sericeus Kroneberg, 1875 — Georgia, Central Asiaa
 Olios sherwoodi Lessert, 1929 — Congo
 Olios similis (O. Pickard-Cambridge, 1890) - Guatemala
 Olios simoni O. P.-Cambridge, 1890 — Guatemala
 Olios sjostedti Lessert, 1921 — East Africa
 Olios skwarrae Roewer, 1933 — Mexico
 Olios somalicus Caporiacco, 1940 — Somalia
 Olios spinipalpis Pocock, 1901 — South Africa
 Olios stictopus Pocock, 1898 — South Africa
 Olios stimulator Simon, 1897 — India
 Olios strandi Kolosváry, 1934 — New Guinea
 Olios suavis O. P.-Cambridge, 1876 — Israel, Egypt
 Olios subadultus Mello-Leitão, 1930 — Brazil
 Olios sulphuratus Thorell, 1899 — Cameroon
 Olios sungaya (Barrion & Litsinger, 1995) - Philippines (Mindanao)   
 Olios suung Jäger, 2012 — Laos
 Olios sylvaticus Blackwall, 1862 — Brazil
 Olios tamerlani Roewer, 1951 — New Guinea
 Olios taprobanicus Strand, 1913  - Sri Lanka
 Olios tarandus Simon, 1897 — India
 Olios tener Thorell, 1891 — Pakistan, India, Myanmar
 Olios tiantongensis Zhang & Kim, 1996 — China
 Olios tigrinus Keyserling, 1880 — Peru
 Olios tikaderi Kundu, Biswas & Raychaudhuri, 1999 — India
 Olios triarmatus Lessert, 1936 — Mozambique
 Olios trifurcatus Pocock, 1899 — Cameroon
 Olios ventrosus Nicolet, 1849 — Chile
 Olios vitiosus Vellard, 1924 — Brazil
 Olios wroughtoni Simon, 1897 — India
 Olios yucatanus Chamberlin, 1925 — Mexico
 Olios zulu'' Simon, 1880 — South Africa

References

Sparassidae
Araneomorphae genera
Cosmopolitan spiders